Michael Douglas Turley (14 February 1936 – 1982) was an English professional footballer who played as a wing half in the Football League for Sheffield Wednesday. He was on the books of Burnley without representing them in the League.

References

1936 births
1982 deaths
Footballers from Rotherham
English footballers
Association football defenders
Sheffield Wednesday F.C. players
Burnley F.C. players
English Football League players